Bapabhupalapatnam is a village in Rowthulapudi Mandal, Kakinada district in the state of Andhra Pradesh in India.

Geography 

Demographics 
 India census, Bapabhupalapatnam had a population of 830, out of which 430 were male and 400 were female. The population of children below 6 years of age was 95. The literacy rate of the village was 55.92%.

References 

Villages in Rowthulapudi mandal